Jean Clédat (7 May 1871 – 29 July 1943) was a French Egyptologist, archaeologist and philologist.

Biography
Thanks to the archaeological program instilled by Gaston Maspero, head of Egyptian Antiquities, Clédat was sent in search of Christian monuments of Egypt. In 1901, he began excavating Bawit (French: Baouît) and in the winter of 1903–4, he uncovered the Bawit monastery of Apa Apollo, founded in the fourth century. He was responsible for excavating many prestigious archaeological sites in Egypt, including Deir Abu Hennis, St. Simeon Monastery, Aswan, Asyut, Akhmim, Sohag, Luxor, Elephantine, Tell el-Herr, Tell el-Maskhouta, Mahemdiah and El Qantara. At Qasr-Gheit (North Sinai), Clédat concluded that it had been a Nabataean station on a secondary caravan route from Arabia to Egypt.

In 1910, Clédat excavated at Pelusium in Tell el-Farama, and made a sketch map of the site and also discovered an inscription mentioning Emperor Hadrian. At various times, Clédat's expeditions were sponsored by others, including the Supreme Council of Antiquities, the Comite, and the Institut Français d'Archéologie Orientale.

Clédat was a prolific author. In his essay, "" (1919), he described Egyptian methods of defense and offense upon the present Suez Canal route in ancient times. In  (1910), the remains of a Byzantine fortress at the same locality are illustrated by a plan, and the Israelite passage of the Red Sea includes an excellent map. Clédat was quite well known for his drawings and outlines. He was a talented artist, and regularly published his work, leaving valuable books still being studied today. After his death in 1943, his archives were donated to the Louvre by his daughter. A street is named after him in his hometown.

Partial works

 , 1904–1999.
  (1872)
  (1898)
  (1899)
  (1899)
  (1899)
  (1901)
  (1901)
  (1901)
  (1902)
  (1902)
  (1904)
  (1910)
  (1910)
  (1911)
  (1913)
  (1913)
  (1915)
  (1915)
  (1916)
  (1919)
  (1925)

Literature
 L'Égypte en Périgord. Dans les pas de Jean Clédat. Catalogue raisonné de l'exposition., Paris – Louvain, Editions Peeters, 1991, S. 1–17.
 Dawson, Warren R. ; Uphill, Eric P. ; Bierbrier, M. L., Who was who in Egyptology, London : The Egypt Exploration Society, 1995 (3. Auflage), S. 101.

References

External links
 

1871 births
1943 deaths
French Egyptologists
French archaeologists
French philologists
Members of the Institut Français d'Archéologie Orientale
People from Périgueux